Kosovar Sadiki (born 27 August 1998) is a Canadian professional soccer player who plays as a centre-back for Italian  club Virtus Entella.

Club career

Finn Harps

Period on loan
On 23 January 2020, Sadiki was loaned out to League of Ireland Premier Division club Finn Harps until the end of the 2020 season. On 14 February 2020, he made his debut in a 1–0 home win against Sligo Rovers after being named in the starting line-up.

Return as a permanent player
In July 2020, Sadiki returned to League of Ireland Premier Division club Finn Harps after being released from his parent club, Hibernian. On 1 August 2020, he made his debut against Shamrock Rovers after being named in the starting line-up and assists in his side's only goal during a 3–1 away defeat.

Virtus Entella
On 4 January 2022, Sadiki signed a multi-year contract with Serie C club Virtus Entella. Eighteen days later, he was named as a Virtus Entella substitute for the first time in a league match against Gubbio. His debut with Virtus Entella came eleven days later in a 5–1 home win against Montevarchi after being named in the starting line-up.

International career
From 2015, until 2018, Sadiki has been part of Canada at youth international level, respectively has been part of the U17, U20 and U23 teams and he with these teams played seven matches and scored two goals. He also played in the 2015 CONCACAF U-17 Championship, 2017 CONCACAF U-20 Championship, and 2018 Toulon Tournament.

Personal life
Sadiki was born in Moers, Germany and raised in Kitchener, Ontario, Canada to Kosovo Albanian parents from Ferizaj. He holds Canadian, Kosovan, Albanian, German and Swedish passports.

References

External links

1998 births
Living people
People from Moers
Sportspeople from Düsseldorf (region)
Soccer people from Ontario
Sportspeople from Kitchener, Ontario
Canadian men's soccer players
Canada men's youth international soccer players
Canadian expatriate soccer players
Canadian expatriate sportspeople in England
Canadian expatriate sportspeople in Croatia
Canadian expatriate sportspeople in Scotland
Canadian expatriate sportspeople in Italy
Canadian people of Kosovan descent
Canadian people of Albanian descent
Kosovan men's footballers
Kosovan expatriate footballers
Kosovan expatriate sportspeople in England
Kosovan expatriate sportspeople in Croatia
Kosovan expatriate sportspeople in Italy
Albanian men's footballers
Albanian expatriate footballers
Albanian expatriate sportspeople in England
Albanian expatriate sportspeople in Croatia
Albanian expatriate sportspeople in Scotland
Albanian expatriate sportspeople in Italy
German men's footballers
German expatriate footballers
German expatriate sportspeople in England
German expatriate sportspeople in Croatia
German expatriate sportspeople in Scotland
German expatriate sportspeople in Italy
German people of Kosovan descent
German people of Albanian descent
Swedish men's footballers
Swedish expatriate footballers
Swedish expatriate sportspeople in England
Swedish expatriate sportspeople in Croatia
Swedish expatriate sportspeople in Scotland
Swedish expatriate sportspeople in Italy
Swedish people of Kosovan descent
Swedish people of Albanian descent
Association football central defenders
Stoke City F.C. players
Stafford Town F.C. players
NK Lokomotiva Zagreb players
Hibernian F.C. players
League of Ireland players
Finn Harps F.C. players
Serie C players
Virtus Entella players
Footballers from North Rhine-Westphalia